The 1983 FA Cup final was contested by Manchester United and Brighton & Hove Albion at Wembley Stadium.

Manchester United were the favourites, as Brighton had been relegated from the First Division that season, and had never reached a cup final before. United had finished third in the league that season and already had four FA Cup victories to their name.

The final ended in a 2–2 draw, forcing a replay at Wembley five days later, which Manchester United won 4–0. It was the third successive year that the FA Cup Final required a replay.

The first match
The first match finished 2–2 after extra time. Gordon Smith and Gary Stevens scored for Brighton; Frank Stapleton and Ray Wilkins for Manchester United. The first game is famous for the radio commentary by Peter Jones "...and Smith must score" talking about a shot by Gordon Smith, which was then saved by the Manchester United goalkeeper Gary Bailey; the quote was subsequently used as a title for a Brighton fanzine. Bailey's save forced a replay and prevented Brighton from winning the first major trophy in their history.

The replay
The second game, on a Thursday night, started the same way as the first game had, with Brighton taking the game to Manchester United. Although their chances were limited to long-range drives from Jimmy Case, United goalkeeper Gary Bailey had a couple of important saves to make. This all changed on 25 minutes, with United's first real attack. Alan Davies, who had made his FA Cup debut in the first game, set up captain Bryan Robson for a left-footed drive past Moseley into the corner of the net. Suddenly the atmosphere changed and it was the Manchester United fans who were singing loudest. This was compounded in the 30th minute, when United went 2–0 up, giving the team a two-goal cushion for the first time over the two matches. Brighton failed to clear a corner, and Davies crossed for Norman Whiteside to score with a header, making the 18 year old the youngest player to ever score in an FA Cup final as per 2019. This capped an incredible 12 months for the teenager, who had played in the 1982 FIFA World Cup for Northern Ireland, and scored in the League Cup final defeat to Liverpool earlier that year.

Brighton were rocked but continued to press, yet went further behind just before half time. Gordon McQueen headed on a free-kick and the ball fell to Robson to tap in at the far post, for his second goal of the game. The scoring was completed in the second half when the Dutch midfielder Arnold Mühren scored a penalty after Robson had been brought down by Stevens in the penalty area. It was the third consecutive year that a penalty had been awarded (and scored) in the Cup Final replay.

This was the first of three times that Bryan Robson captained Manchester United to FA Cup glory; he also achieved the feat in 1985 and 1990.

Match details

Replay match details

References

External links
Line-ups

1983
Final
Fa Cup Final 1983
Fa Cup Final 1983
FA Cup Final
FA Cup Final